Sławomir Poleszak (born 1969) is a Polish historian, employed by Institute of National Remembrance since 2000, who is an expert on cursed soldiers. He was decorated with Knight's Cross of the Order of Polonia Restituta by President Andrzej Duda. Poleszak is the editor-in-chief of ohistorie.eu portal.

References

1969 births
Living people
People associated with the Institute of National Remembrance
Knights of the Order of Polonia Restituta
20th-century Polish historians
Polish male non-fiction writers
21st-century Polish historians